Alfie Hewett defeated the defending champion Gustavo Fernández in the final, 0–6, 7–6(11–9), 6–2 to win the men's singles wheelchair tennis title at the 2017 French Open. It was his first major singles title.

Seeds

Draw

Finals

References
 Draw

Wheelchair Men's Singles
French Open, 2017 Men's Singles